The 1991 Canadian Open was a tennis tournament played on outdoor hard courts. It was the 102nd edition of the Canada Masters, and was part of the ATP Super 9 of the 1991 ATP Tour, and of the Tier I Series of the 1991 WTA Tour. The men's event took place at the Uniprix Stadium in Montreal, Canada from July 22 through July 28, 1991, and the women's event at the  National Tennis Centre in Toronto, Ontario, Canada from August 5 through August 11, 1991.

Finals

Men's singles

 Andrei Chesnokov defeated  Petr Korda, 3–6, 6–4, 6–3
It was Andrei Chesnokov's 1st title of the year and his 7th overall. It was his 1st Masters title of the year and his 2nd overall.

Women's singles

 Jennifer Capriati defeated  Katerina Maleeva, 6–2, 6–3
It was Jennifer Capriati's 2nd title of the year and her 3rd overall. It was her 1st Tier I title.

Men's doubles

 Patrick Galbraith /  Todd Witsken defeated  Grant Connell /  Glenn Michibata, 6–4, 3–6, 6–1

Women's doubles

 Larisa Savchenko-Neiland /  Natalia Zvereva defeated  Claudia Kohde-Kilsch /  Helena Suková 1–6, 7–5, 6–2

References

External links
 
 Association of Tennis Professionals (ATP) tournament profile
 Women's Tennis Association (WTA) tournament profile
 1991 Main Draw

Canadian Open
Canadian Open
Canadian Open
 Canadian Open
Open
Canadian Open (tennis)